Robert Rono (born 16 August 1978) is a Kenyan former middle-distance runner who specialized in the 1500 metres. He was the gold medallist in that event at the 2002 Africa Military Games and took this success to the global level with a win at the 2002 World Military Track and Field Championships later that year. He was runner-up to Paul Korir at the 2003 All-Africa Games.

International competitions

Personal bests
1500 metres - 3:30.99 min (2002)
Mile run - 3:50.98 min (2003)

References

External links

1978 births
Living people
Kenyan male middle-distance runners
African Games silver medalists for Kenya
African Games medalists in athletics (track and field)
Athletes (track and field) at the 2003 All-Africa Games